The Orange Line, also known as the North–south corridor, of the Nagpur Metro is a metro route of mass rapid transit system in Nagpur, India. It consists of 20 metro stations from Automotive Square to Metro City with a total distance of 22.293 km. Most of the line is elevated. It is the first line of the Nagpur Metro and was inaugurated by Prime Minister Narendra Modi on 7 March 2019, and opened to the public the next day on International Women's Day.

This corridor originates from Automotive Square on Kamptee Road; moves along Kamptee Road and reaches the intersection point of Amravati Road and Wardha Road, then after crossing fly over moves towards Munje Square, moves towards Dhantoli and along nala moves towards Empire/Dr Munje Marg, leads towards Congress Nagar T-Point, then on Rahate Colony Road and then falls on Wardha Road, leads towards NEERI, then moves along Wardha Road and then west of Railway Track in MIHAN area. And passes through 14m wide stretch of land between the railway boundary line and the road near proposed Container Depot.

Entire length (22.2938 km.) of this corridor is proposed as elevated except in 4.6 km at grade after Airport Station and in MIHAN area near Khapri Railway Station. There are 20 stations on this corridor of which 15 stations are elevated and 5 stations are at Grade. Sitaburdi Station is an inter-change station. Average inter-station distance is 1.20 km approximately varying from 0.54 km to 2.4 km depending upon the site, operational and traffic requirements.

This line initially started operations with five stations opening in the stretch between Sitabuldi and Khapri on 8 March 2019.

List of stations 
Following is a list of stations on this route-

See also 

 Nagpur Metro
 List of Nagpur Metro stations
 Aqua Line (Nagpur Metro)
 Maharashtra Metro Rail Corporation Limited

References 

Nagpur Metro
Railway lines opened in 2019